Sigfússon is a surname of Icelandic origin, meaning son of Sigfús. In Icelandic names, the name is not strictly a surname, but a patronymic. The name refers to:
Árni Sigfússon (contemporary), Icelandic businessman and local politician
Skuli Sigfusson (1870–1969), Canadian politician from Manitoba; provincial legislator 1915–45
Steingrímur J. Sigfússon (b. 1955), Icelandic politician; member of the Alþing since 1983; government minister

Icelandic-language surnames